Swedish Association of International Affairs (SAIA) (Swedish: Utrikespolitiska Förbundet Sverige (UFS)) is an umbrella organization for the associations of international affairs that can be found in most of the major university cities in Sweden. It has a total of 11 member organizations, which have about 4,000 members in between themselves and organize about 400 events per year. The main focus of its member organizations is the furthering of debate of international issues at the respective universities through lectures with politicians, diplomats, academics, activists, and others.

History 

The first member organization of UFS, the Uppsala Student Association for the League of Nations, was founded in 1925. Together with the other three original member associations at Gothenburg University, Lund University, and Stockholm University, it founded Sweden's Academic Association for the League of Nations, which in turn was part of the International University Federation of the League of Nations (IUFLN). However, in 1935, the Swedish branch left IUFLN and with its renaming into the Swedish Academic Association for Foreign Affairs (SAFU) in 1939, the break-off was completed. With the outbreak of World War II, both the local and the umbrella organizations were dissolved. After the war, they were founded anew, this time under an umbrella organization of the United Nations (UN). However, this organization was vacated in the mid-1980s. In 1997, a new umbrella organization was created by five associations under the name of Sweden's Foreign-Policy Associations and in 2007, it was renamed into the Swedish Association of International Affairs.

Activities 

As a mother organization, SAIA supports its member organizations both financially and by encouraging cooperation and the exchange of information between the various organizations. Members of the associations organized in SAIA can also attend lectures at any of the other associations. Each organization has a delegate on SAIA's board. Further, SAIA arranges meetings between the member associations' organizing committees, as well as the Annual Conference on Foreign Affairs (Swedish: Utrikespolitiskt Konvent), which is open to all members of the associations and consists of workshops and lectures. SAIA also maintains a presence at Almedalen every year.

SAIA is a member of both the National Council of Swedish Youth Organisations (LSU) and the Swedish NGO Society and Defence. The association also cooperates closely with the Swedish Institute for International Affairs (UI).

Member organizations 
The Society of International Affairs Gothenburg
The Association of Foreign Affairs Karlstad
Utrikespolitiska studentföreningen vid Linköpings universitet
Utrikespolitiska föreningen Luleå
Utrikespolitiska föreningen i Lund
Malmö Association of Foreign Affairs
Stockholm Association of International Affairs
Utrikespolitiska Föreningen vid Umeå Universitet
Uppsala Association of International Affairs
Society of International Affairs Växjö
Örebro Society of International Affairs

Chairpersons 
 2020/2021 Johan Bergman
 2019/2020 Sakke Teerikoski
 2018/2019 Hanna Waerland
 2017/2018 Oscar Theblin
 2016/2017 Rosaline Marbinah
 2015/2016 Axel Nordenstam
 2014/2015 Anna Welsapar
 2013/2014 Aria Nakhaei
 2012/2013 Joakim Bong Henriksson
 2011/2012 Johan Tinnerholm
 2010/2011 Frida Vernersdotter
 2009/2010 Tamuz Hidir
 2008/2009 Abrak Saati
 2007/2008 Eric Hale

External links

Notes 

Universities and colleges in Sweden